Hermann Haverkamp (20 August 1942 – 3 November 2021) was a German water polo player. He competed at the 1968 Summer Olympics and the 1972 Summer Olympics.

Haverkamp died on 3 November 2021, at the age of 79.

References

External links
 

1942 births
2021 deaths
German male water polo players
Olympic water polo players of West Germany
Water polo players at the 1968 Summer Olympics
Water polo players at the 1972 Summer Olympics
Sportspeople from Duisburg